Pascale Lebecque (born 18 April 1989) is a French compound archer. She is the current World Archery number six in women's compound archery. The highest ranking she has reached is also the sixth position, which she reached for the last time in June 2012.

Palmares

2008
10th, World University Championships, individual, Tainan
2009
6th, World Indoor Championships, individual, Rzeszow
17th, Summer Universiade, individual, Belgrade
 World Cup, women's team, Shanghai
8th, World Outdoor Championships, individual, Ulsan
10th, World Outdoor Championships, women's team, Ulsan
2010
6th, European Outdoor Championships, women's team, Rovereto
17th, European Outdoor Championships, individual, Rovereto
8th, World University Championships, mixed team, Shenzhen
9th, World University Championships, individual, Shenzhen
2011
 World Cup, women's team, Poreč
 EMAU Grand Prix, individual, Boé
 EMAU Grand Prix, women's team, Boé
 World Cup, mixed team, Antalya
 World Outdoor Championships, individual, Turin
9th, World Outdoor Championships, women's team, Turin
 Summer Universiade, women's team, Shenzhen
9th, Summer Universiade, individual, Shenzhen
 World Cup, mixed team, Shanghai
2012
6th, World Indoor Championships, individual, Las Vegas
6th, Indoor World Cup Final, individual, Las Vegas
 World Cup, mixed team, Shanghai
 European Outdoor Championships, women's team, Amsterdam
4th, European Outdoor Championships, individual, Amsterdam
5th, European Outdoor Championships, mixed team, Amsterdam

References

External links

 

French female archers
Living people
1989 births
World Archery Championships medalists
Universiade medalists in archery
Universiade gold medalists for France
Medalists at the 2011 Summer Universiade
21st-century French women